Storm Electronic Music Festival, or simply Storm Music Festival, was an annual outdoor electronic music festival that took place around October in the city of Shanghai. The festival was founded in 2013 by Eric Chow. Other Storm festivals take place across China in locations like Shenzhen, Chengdu, Guangzhou, Beijing, Nanjing, and Changsha. At the end of Storm Festival 2017, it added one more country: Australia.

Shows

References

External links 
 

Annual events in Shanghai
Electronic music festivals in China
Festivals in Shanghai
Music festivals established in 2013
Music festivals in China
2013 establishments in China